Music Canada (formerly Canadian Recording Industry Association (CRIA)) is a non-profit trade organization that was founded 9 April 1963 to represent the interests of companies that record, manufacture, produce, and distribute music in Canada. It also offers benefits to some of Canada's leading independent record labels and distributors.

History
Originally formed as the 10-member Canadian Record Manufacturer's Association, the association changed its name to Canadian Recording Industry Association (CRIA) in 1972 and opened membership to other record industry companies.

In 2006, the CRIA was in the news when a number of smaller labels resigned their memberships, complaining that the organization wasn't representing their interests. In 2011, it changed its name to Music Canada offering special benefits to some of the leading independent labels and distributors in Canada.

Organization
Music Canada is governed by a board of directors who are elected annually by association members. To be eligible for election a candidate for the board must be among the executive officers of the member companies. Patrick Rogers (formerly the Vice President, Corporate Affairs) was named the new Chief Executive Officer, effective 11 January 2021.  Graham Henderson had been president from 15 November 2004 to 28 May 2020; Brian Robertson previously held the position from 1974.
Class A members are Canadian individuals or companies whose principal business is producing, manufacturing, or marketing sound recordings. These members hold voting rights, and currently consist of the "big four" record labels.
Class B members are Canadian individuals or companies whose principal business is producing sound recordings. These members pay a $600 annual membership fee but have no voting rights. As of 2007, there were 22 class B members.
Manufacturing Division members are Canadian individuals or companies whose principal business is manufacturing sound recordings.

Other services
Music Canada is responsible for the distribution of ISRC registrant codes within Canada, and also works with the IFPI and RIAA to try to prevent copyright infringement of artists' work.

Representation
Historically, Music Canada has represented all record labels in the country. Recently, however, some labels and other industry groups have publicly disagreed with Music Canada and claim it no longer represents them. In 2006, six well-known "indie" labels including Nettwerk left Music Canada in a dispute over Canadian content rules. They claimed the association was only protecting the interests of "the four major foreign multi-national labels," referring to EMI, Universal, Sony BMG, and Warner. Other points of contention include Music Canada's stance against the blank media tax, their support for digital locks on music, and positions against copyright reform. In 2007 a group of musicians formed the Canadian Music Creators Coalition, claiming "legislative proposals that would facilitate lawsuits against our fans or increase the labels' control over the enjoyment of music are made not in our names, but on behalf of the labels' foreign parent companies."

Legal actions
On February 16, 2004, Music Canada applied to the Federal Court to force five major Canadian internet service providers — Shaw Communications Inc., Telus Corp., Rogers Cable, Bell Canada's Sympatico service and Quebec's Vidéotron — to hand over the names of 29 people accused of copyright infringement through peer-to-peer file sharing. In April 2005, Vidéotron indicated its willingness to supply customer information to Music Canada.

On March 31, 2004, in the case of BMG v. John Doe, Justice Konrad von Finckenstein of the Federal Court of Canada ruled that making music available for download over the Internet was not equivalent to distribution and was thus noninfringing. The Justice compared the peer-to-peer filesharing activities to "having a photocopier in a library room full of copyrighted material" and wrote that there was no evidence of unauthorized distribution presented. The Federal Court of Appeal upheld the lower courts ruling denying the disclosure of the customers' identities, but, in reference to "what would or would not constitute infringement of copyright," stated: "such conclusions should not have been made in the very preliminary stages of this action, since they would require a consideration of the evidence as well as the law applicable to such evidence after it has been properly adduced, and could be damaging to the parties if a trial takes place."
The Copyright Board of Canada earlier that year had included downloading music in the list of "private copying" activities for which tariffs on blank media applied. (Private copying is the act of copying music for personal use from a noninfringing source, and is itself noninfringing.) That made it extremely unlikely that downloaders could be successfully prosecuted, leaving only the  possibility of acting against uploaders, those supplying the works to others on the networks. 
In 2008, the operators of the isoHunt website filed a motion with the Supreme Court of British Columbia seeking a declaratory judgment affirming the legality of their operation. The motion was denied, and the court ruled a full trial was needed. This decision was appealed by the operators of isoHunt; the appeal was also denied. In late 2009, isoHunt filed a formal suit against Music Canada and the four "major" record labels seeking "declaratory relief to clarify its legal rights."

Additionally, in October 2008, the four main members of Music Canada were sued by the estate of Chet Baker and several other artists for copyright infringement. The major claims in this lawsuit are as follows:

That some three hundred thousand works were illegally distributed by the Music Canada's members, and
That they failed to seek proper licensing and distribution agreements with the creators of the aforementioned works, instead placing the works on what is colloquially referred to as a "pending list" (i.e., any payments to be made for the use of the aforementioned works are reserved, pending an agreement with the artists who created the works).

As the standard punitive damages for each act of infringement is set at $20,000, and there are three hundred thousand works on the "pending lists", Music Canada could have faced punitive damages of a minimum of $6 billion. On November 8, 2011, the suit was settled out of court for over $45 million.

Certification awards

Albums

Singles
Prior to September 12, 2016, Music Canada had different certification levels for physical singles and Digital downloads singles. On that date, the digital downloads singles award was discontinued and single awards include digital singles. It also includes streams, where 150 on-demand audio streams from a subscription service equals 1 unit towards certification.

Certification before September 2016
Physical singles

Digital downloads (singles)

Note that Music Canada certifies Digital-downloads (and from September 12, 2016, any singles) always applying the most recent certifications-levels, even to those titles that are released during the time frame the CRIA (currently Music Canada) had lower certification-levels for Digital-downloads. One such example is the single "Right Round" by Flo Rida feat. Kesha, which was released in January 2009 when certification-levels for Digital-downloads were 10,000 units for Gold and 20,000 units for Platinum. The CRIA (currently Music Canada) certified it three times Platinum in October 2010, applying the latest certification-levels for sales of 240,000 units.

RingTones (singles)
Ringtone certifications were retired April 1, 2021.

Music DVD
Music DVD certifications were retired April 1, 2021.

See also
 Canadian Private Copying Collective
 RIAA

Notes

A  One of the first physical singles that was certified with levels of Gold=5,000 and Platinum=10,000 was "A Moment Like This" by Kelly Clarkson, which was released on September 17, 2002.
B  One of the first digital singles that was certified with levels of Gold=20,000 and Platinum=40,000 was "Paralyzer" by Finger Eleven, which was released as a digital track on March 6, 2007.
C  One of the first digital singles that was certified with levels of Gold=40,000 and Platinum=80,000 was "OMG" by Usher, which was released as a digital track on March 30, 2010.

References

External links
 

Music industry associations
Non-profit organizations based in Toronto
Organizations established in 1963
Music organizations based in Canada
1963 establishments in Canada